Matthew Owen Wilkinson (born 17 December 1980) is an English cricketer. He was a right-handed batsman who played for Norfolk. He was born in Norwich.

Having represented Norfolk in the Minor Counties Championship and Minor Counties Trophy between 2002 and 2006, Wilkinson made a single List A appearance for the team, in the C&G Trophy in August 2003.

Wilkinson scored a duck in the match and took one catch.

As of 2009, Wilkinson still represents Horsford in the East Anglian Premier Cricket League.

External links
Matthew Wilkinson at CricketArchive 

1980 births
Living people
English cricketers
Norfolk cricketers
Cricketers from Norwich